The 10th Lumières Awards ceremony, presented by the Académie des Lumières, was held on 16 February 2005. The ceremony was hosted by Patrick Souquet and presided by Alain Corneau. The Chorus won the award for Best Film.

Winners

See also
 30th César Awards

References

External links
 
 
 10th Lumières Awards at AlloCiné

Lumières Awards
Lumières
Lumières
Lumières Awards
Lumières Awards